The Conversation is a 1974 American mystery thriller film written, produced, and directed by Francis Ford Coppola and starring Gene Hackman, John Cazale, Allen Garfield, Cindy Williams, Frederic Forrest, Harrison Ford, Teri Garr, and Robert Duvall. The film revolves around a surveillance expert and the moral dilemma he faces when his recordings reveal a potential murder. 

The Conversation premiered at the 1974 Cannes Film Festival, where it won the Palme d'Or, the festival's highest prize, and was released theatrically on April 7, 1974 by Paramount Pictures to critical acclaim but box office disappointment, grossing $4.2 million on a $1.6 million budget. The film received three nominations at the 47th Academy Awards; Best Picture, Best Original Screenplay, and Best Sound.

In 1995, it was selected for preservation in the United States National Film Registry by the Library of Congress as being "culturally, historically, or aesthetically significant".

Plot
Surveillance expert Harry Caul runs his own company in San Francisco and is obsessed with his own privacy. His apartment is almost bare behind its triple-locked door and burglar alarm, he uses pay phones to make calls, claims to have no home telephone, and his office is enclosed in a chain-link cage in a corner of a much larger warehouse. He has no friends, his girlfriend Amy knows little about him, and his sole hobby is playing along to jazz records on a tenor saxophone alone in his apartment.

Caul insists that he is not responsible for the content of the conversations he records or the use to which his clients put his surveillance. However, he is wracked with guilt about a past wiretap job that was followed by the murders of three people. His sense of guilt is amplified by his devout Catholicism.

Caul, his colleague Stan, and some freelance associates have been tasked with bugging the conversation of a couple as they walk through crowded Union Square in San Francisco. Against a cacophony of background noise, the couple discusses their fear that they are being watched and mention a discreet meeting at a hotel room in a few days. The challenging task of recording this is accomplished by having surveillance operatives located in different positions around the square. After Caul filters and merges the different tapes, the result is a sound recording is clear but the meaning is ambiguous.

Caul delivers the recording but his client is not in his office. Caul refuses to leave the tape with Martin Stett, his client's assistant. The assistant warns him against getting involved and tells Caul that the tapes are "dangerous.” After refusing to turn the tape over, Caul leaves and sees both the man and the woman. Increasingly uneasy about what may happen to the couple, Caul repeatedly plays the tape and refines the recording. Using a filter, he reveals a key phrase hidden under the sound of a street musician: "He'd kill us if he got the chance."

Caul avoids turning the tape over to the aide of the man who commissioned the surveillance. Pressured by the client's aide, Caul realizes that he is being followed, tricked, and bugged. The tape is stolen from him while his guard is down. Caul goes to the client ("the Director,") who has received the tapes, and learns that the woman in the recording is the client's wife and is apparently having an affair with the other man in the tapes.

Caul books a hotel room next to one mentioned in the recording. He uses equipment to overhear the client in a heated argument with his wife. When he goes to the balcony to watch the events through the windows, he believes he sees the wife being murdered and retreats in shock. He later breaks into the hotel room to find no sign of a murder scene except for a toilet filled with bloody toilet paper.

Caul attempts to confront the client at his office in the Embarcadero Center but the client is absent. While departing, Caul notices the wife, alive and unharmed, in a limousine. He learns that his client was killed in an "accident" and discovers the truth; the couple he heard in Union Square was talking about killing the woman's husband and the murder Caul witnessed was that of his client and not the wife.

Caul gets a phone call from Stett, who plays a recording of Caul's saxophone playing from seconds earlier and tells him not to look into the matter, adding "We'll be listening to you." Caul frantically searches for a listening device, tearing up his entire apartment, to no avail. He sits amid the wreckage playing his saxophone, the only thing in his apartment left intact.

Cast

Production
Coppola has cited Michelangelo Antonioni's Blowup (1966) as a key influence on his conceptualization of the film's themes, such as surveillance versus participation, and perception versus reality. "Francis had seen [it] a year or two before, and had the idea to fuse the concept of Blowup with the world of audio surveillance."

On the DVD commentary, Coppola says he was shocked to learn that the film used the same surveillance and wire-tapping equipment that members of the Nixon Administration used to spy on political opponents prior to the Watergate scandal. Coppola has said this reason is why the film gained part of the recognition it has received, but it is entirely coincidental. Not only was the script for The Conversation completed in the mid-1960s (before the Nixon Administration came to power), but the spying equipment used in the film was discovered through research and the use of technical advisers, and not, as many believed, by revelatory newspaper stories about the Watergate break-in. Coppola also noted that filming of The Conversation had been completed several months before the most revelatory Watergate stories broke in the press. Because the film was released to theaters just a few months before Richard Nixon resigned as president, Coppola felt that audiences interpreted the film to be a reaction to both the Watergate scandal and its fall-out.

The original cinematographer of The Conversation was Haskell Wexler. Severe creative and personal differences with Coppola led to Wexler's firing shortly after production began, and Coppola replaced him with Bill Butler. Wexler's footage on The Conversation was completely reshot except for the technically complex surveillance scene in Union Square. This movie was the first of two Oscar-nominated films where Wexler would be fired and replaced by Butler, the second being One Flew Over the Cuckoo's Nest (1975), where Wexler had similar problems with Miloš Forman.

Walter Murch served as the supervising editor and sound designer. Murch had more or less a free hand during the editing process because Coppola was working on The Godfather Part II at the time. Coppola noted in the DVD commentary that Hackman had a very difficult time adapting to the Harry Caul character because he was so much unlike himself. Coppola says that Hackman was at the time an outgoing and approachable person who preferred casual clothes, whereas Caul was meant to be a socially awkward loner who wore a rain coat and out-of-style glasses. Coppola said that Hackman's efforts to tap into the character made the actor moody and irritable on set, but otherwise Coppola got along well with his leading man. Coppola also notes on the commentary that Hackman considers this one of his favorite performances.

The Conversation features a piano score composed and performed by David Shire. The score was created before the film was shot. On some cues, Shire used musique concrète techniques, taking the taped sounds of the piano and distorting them in different ways to create alternative tonalities to round out the score. The score was released on CD by Intrada Records in 2001.

Inspiration
The character of Harry Caul was inspired by surveillance technology expert Martin Kaiser, who also served as a technical consultant on the film. According to Kaiser, the final scene of the film—in which Caul is convinced he is being eavesdropped in his apartment, cannot find the listening device, and consoles himself by playing his saxophone—was inspired by the passive covert listening devices created by Léon Theremin, such as the Great Seal bug. "He couldn't find out where [the bug] was because it was the instrument itself."

Coppola also based Caul on the protagonist of Herman Hesse's 1927 novel Steppenwolf, Harry Haller, a "total cipher" who lives alone in a boarding house. Coppola also made Caul religious, originally intending the character to have a confession scene; Coppola has said that the practice of confession is "one of the earliest forms of the invasion of privacy--earliest forms of surveillance."

Reception

Box office
The film had a $1,600,000 budget and grossed $4,420,000 in the U.S.

Critical response
According to Rotten Tomatoes, 97% of critics have given the film a positive review based on 67 reviews, with an average rating of 8.8/10. The site's critics consensus reads "This tense, paranoid thriller presents Francis Ford Coppola at his finest—and makes some remarkably advanced arguments about technology's role in society that still resonate today." On Metacritic, the film has a weighted average score of 87 out of 100 based on 17 critics, indicating "universal acclaim".

Roger Ebert's contemporary review gave The Conversation four out of four stars and described Hackman's portrayal of Caul as "one of the most affecting and tragic characters in the movies". In 2001, Ebert added The Conversation to his "Great Movies" list, describing Hackman's performance as a "career peak" and writing that the film "comes from another time and place than today's thrillers, which are so often simple-minded".

In 1995, The Conversation was selected for preservation in the United States National Film Registry by the Library of Congress as being "culturally, historically, or aesthetically significant". Gene Hackman has named the film his favorite of all those he has made. His performance in the lead role was listed as the 37th greatest in history by Premiere magazine in 2006. In 2012, the Motion Picture Editors Guild listed the film as the 11th-best edited film of all time based on a survey of its membership.

Accolades
The Conversation won the Grand Prix du Festival International du Film, the highest honor at the 1974 Cannes Film Festival. The film was also nominated for three Academy Awards for 1974, but the Academy preferred Coppola's The Godfather Part II, unlike critics in the National Board of Review and the National Society of Film Critics.

Influence and legacy
According to film critic Kim Newman, the 1998 film Enemy of the State, which also stars Gene Hackman as co-protagonist, could be construed as a "continuation of The Conversation". Hackman's character Edward Lyle in Enemy of the State closely resembles Caul: he dons the same translucent raincoat, and his workshop is nearly identical to Caul's. Also, the photograph used for Lyle in his NSA file is actually a photograph of Caul. Enemy of the State also includes a scene which is very similar to The Conversation'''s opening surveillance scene in San Francisco's Union Square.

The film ranked 33rd on the BBC's 2015 list of "100 Greatest American Films", voted by film critics from around the world. In 2016, The Hollywood Reporter ranked the film 8th among 69 counted winners of the Palme d'Or to date, concluding "Made in a flash between the first two Godfather movies, Coppola’s existential spy thriller has since become a pinnacle of the genre."

A television pilot starring Kyle MacLachlan as Harry Caul was produced for NBC. It was not picked up for a full series.

See also
 List of American films of 1974
 List of films featuring surveillanceBlow Out'', a 1981 Brian De Palma film that is similar in content

References

Bibliography

External links

 The Conversation essay by Peter Keough at National Film Registry
 The Conversation essay by Daniel Eagan in America's Film Legacy: The Authoritative Guide-to the Landmark Movies in the National Film Registry, A&C Black, 2010 , pages 704-705

 
 
 

1974 films
1970s mystery thriller films
American mystery thriller films
American Zoetrope films
BAFTA winners (films)
Films about security and surveillance
Films directed by Francis Ford Coppola
Films produced by Francis Ford Coppola
Films scored by David Shire
Films set in the San Francisco Bay Area
Films set in San Francisco
Films shot in San Francisco
Mariticide in fiction
Palme d'Or winners
Films with screenplays by Francis Ford Coppola
United States National Film Registry films
American neo-noir films
1970s English-language films
1970s American films